The Australian International School Hong Kong (AISHK) is a private co-educational international school in Kowloon Tong, Kowloon, Hong Kong, China. Established in 1995, the school provides education for children from Preparatory to Year 12 plus a Reception (K2) kindergarten class.

History 
The school was founded to fulfill the growing demand for an Australian educational institution in Hong Kong. Brian Davies, a teacher at the Canadian International School who had lived in Hong Kong since 1986, was approached by members of the Australian Association of Hong Kong to create an Australian school. Additionally, local Hong Kong businessmen suggested to Davies to create a for profit school to prepare their children for the possibility of studying in Australian universities upon graduation. The school opened on 6 February 1995 and in 1999 the first group Year 10 students were awarded their NSW School Certificate.

In 1996 it began its secondary education levels.

The school's permanent campus in Kowloon Tong was opened on 4 September 2001, with student numbers growing to over 500 students that year.

Mark Hemphill served as principal until his 2020 resignation. Dr Bill McKeith, who recruited Hemphill, attributed the resignation to the COVID-19 pandemic and the Hong Kong national security law.

Curriculum 
The school offers education from Reception to Year 12. The primary curriculum is based on the Australian National Curriculum that has been adapted to suit the international setting. Students in Year 7-10 follow the NSW Stage 4 & 5 Syllabus developed by the New South Wales Board of Studies. In Years 11 and 12, students can select either the Higher School Certificate of the New South Wales Board of Studies or the IB Diploma Programme. Mandarin Chinese is taught as part of Chinese Studies to Primary students, as part of a language in Year 7–8, and as an elective in Year 8–12.

As of an unspecified year, the IB diploma programme track has about 33% of senior level pupils.

School system 
The school follows a southern hemisphere calendar where the school year starts in February and ends in mid-December. The school year is broken up into four terms, with breaks usually in April, July, October, and December.

The school operates under a house system where each student is assigned to a House. The Houses compete against each other each year in competitions to win points. At the end of the school year, the House with the most points is awarded the House Cup. The Houses are named after Australian plants: Eucalypt (green), Jacaranda (blue), Waratah (red), and Wattle (yellow).

As of 1996, the school uses Australian school holidays.

Campus 
AISHK is located close to American International School Hong Kong (AIS). The building is ten stories tall with facilities such as an artificially turfed sports field, a gymnasium, a multi-purpose hall, a library, an auditorium, an aquatic centre with a 25-metre swimming pool, and a green roof.

The campus building was the winner of the 2001 HKIA Medal of the Year, Hong Kong's foremost architectural award.

Notable alumni 
 Stephanie Cheng, singer
 Viking Wong, Brazilian jiu-jitsu practitioner and fashion designer

References

External links 
 

Kowloon Tong
Primary schools in Hong Kong
Secondary schools in Hong Kong
International schools in Hong Kong
Hong Kong
International Baccalaureate schools in Hong Kong
Association of China and Mongolia International Schools
Educational institutions established in 1995
1995 establishments in Hong Kong